Alexander Alexandrovich Bryukhankov (born 12 April 1987 in Rybinsk) is a Russian professional triathlete, Russian Elite Champion of the year 2011, 2008 and 2012 Olympian, and a member of the Russian National Team. Alexander Brykhankov is the elder brother of Andrey Bryukhankov.

According to the Men's Standing (9 September 2010), Bryukhankov was number 3 in 2010. In 2011, Bryukhankov won the bronze medal at the European Championships and in the World Championship Series 2011 ranking he is number 2.

Alexander Bryukhankov also took part in the French Club Championship Series Lyonnaise des Eaux. In 2011, he represented St Jean de Monts Vendee. At the opening triathlon in Nice (24 April 2011) he placed 9th. In 2010, Bryukhankov represented Mulhouse Olympique Tri. At the opening triathlon in Dunkirk (23 May 2010), Bryukhankov placed 21st. At Beauvais, Paris and Tourangeaux Bryukhankov did not take part. At Paris, his brother Andrey Bryukhankov represented Alexander Bryukhankov's club Mulhouse and placed 45th, at the Grand Final he placed 40th.

ITU Competitions 
In the six years from 2006 to 2010, Alexander Bryukhankov took part in 55 ITU competitions and achieved 34 top ten positions.
The following list is based upon the official ITU rankings and the ITU Athletes's Profile Page.
Unless indicated otherwise, the following events are triathlons (Olympic Distance) and refer to the Elite category.

BG = the sponsor British Gas · DNF = did not finish · DNS = did not start

Notes

External links 
 Russian Triathlon Federation 
 
 
 

Russian male triathletes
1987 births
Living people
People from Rybinsk
Olympic triathletes of Russia
Triathletes at the 2008 Summer Olympics
Triathletes at the 2012 Summer Olympics
Triathletes at the 2016 Summer Olympics
Triathletes at the 2015 European Games
European Games competitors for Russia
Sportspeople from Yaroslavl Oblast
20th-century Russian people
21st-century Russian people